Ronald George Fraser (June 25, 1933 – January 20, 2013) was the college baseball coach at the University of Miami from 1963 to 1992.

Nicknamed the "Wizard of College Baseball," he was one of the most successful coaches in NCAA baseball history and was also responsible for bringing college baseball to a new level of public awareness. The Miami Hurricanes baseball team went from being on the brink of being "contracted" to being the toast of college baseball under Fraser's tenure.

Early years as player and coach
Born and raised in Nutley, New Jersey, Fraser was a three-sport letterman at Nutley High School where he graduated in 1953. After graduation, he played baseball for Florida State University from 1954 to 1956 as a relief pitcher. At Florida State, he joined Theta Chi. After that he was in the Army for some years, stationed in Germany and the Netherlands. He became manager of the Germany national baseball team after the 1958 European championship, and he managed the Netherlands until 1963. In 1963, Fraser took a head coaching job with the University of Miami, a school which did not offer its baseball players a scholarship. Even though the school did not begin to offer scholarships until 1973, Fraser built a program. Some of the people Fraser brought to visit the school to bring publicity to the program were Major League Baseball Hall of Famers Ted Williams and Stan Musial, as well as announcer Joe Garagiola. In 1974, Miami was runner-up to the University of Southern California, a perennial college baseball powerhouse. The previous year, Miami started a record streak of consecutive postseason appearances in college baseball, a record which as of the 2016 season is still being added to. Also in 1973, Mark Light Stadium was built in large part to efforts by Fraser to build a privately funded stadium.

The 1980s

The 1980s were a time of great change in Miami athletics. The Miami Hurricanes football team won championships in 1983, 1987 and 1989. While the success of Miami football seemed to eclipse much of the success of the baseball program, Miami won its first two college world series in 1982 and 1985. While opponents' fans often criticized Hurricane football fans for not selling out the Orange Bowl. Mark Light Stadium was almost always a full house for Hurricane baseball games and Fraser's Hurricanes drew 1.27 million fans in the '80s, the best in college baseball. In 1992, Fraser retired as coach of Miami baseball, and for a short time was head of the U.S. Amateur National Baseball Team. The building that houses the baseball offices is named after him, the Ron Fraser Building.

1992 Summer Olympics
The 1992 Summer Olympics marked the first time that baseball was an official medal sport. Fraser coached the United States national baseball team, which per Olympic rules at the time was restricted to amateur players only. Fraser's 20-player squad of college baseball players included future major leaguers such as Jason Giambi, Nomar Garciaparra, and Jason Varitek. The team had a 5–2 record in pool play, then fell to Cuba in the semifinals, followed by a loss to Japan in the bronze-medal match.

Fraser's impact on college sports

Fraser's impact on college baseball, University of Miami athletics, and college athletics, in general, are hard to overestimate. In the mid-1970s when Hurricane football was on the verge of being eliminated, Fraser's resurrection of Miami baseball was a useful model. The University knew that with the right football coach in place, Miami could do the same thing in football that it did in baseball. Without that model, Miami might have just dropped football unceremoniously. Fraser was also instrumental in lobbying ESPN to broadcast college baseball games, something which is now part of their rotation of spring sports. Fraser also helped get the momentum going to reinstate Miami's dormant basketball program which has seen sporadic success. Ron Fraser's special gift for promotion has served as a model for many college Olympic sports programs around the country which have traditionally had difficulty attracting spectators.

Death
Fraser died on January 20, 2013, at his home in Weston, Florida of complications from Alzheimer's disease.

Head coaching record

See also

List of college baseball coaches with 1,100 wins
Miami Maniac

References

1933 births
2013 deaths
Florida State Seminoles baseball players
Miami Hurricanes baseball coaches
National College Baseball Hall of Fame inductees
Nutley High School alumni
People from Nutley, New Jersey
Baseball players from New Jersey
Sportspeople from Essex County, New Jersey
Deaths from dementia in Florida
Deaths from Alzheimer's disease
American expatriate baseball people in the Netherlands
United States Army personnel
Murray State Racers baseball players
American expatriate sportspeople in Germany
Baseball coaches from New Jersey